Last Love (Italian: Ultimo amore) is a 1947 Italian melodrama film directed by Luigi Chiarini and starring Clara Calamai, Andrea Checchi and Carlo Ninchi. It set during the Second World War with Italy close to defeat and increasingly occupied by German troops. Three Italian soldiers are enjoying some leave when they become involved with an enigmatic female singer!.

Cast
 Clara Calamai as Maria, la canzonetista  
 Andrea Checchi as Il capitano Rastelli  
 Carlo Ninchi as Il cappelano 
 Dante Maggio as Il partner di Maria  
 Aroldo Tieri as Il sergente d'aviazione  
 Vira Silenti as La sorella del sergente  
 Giacomo Rondinella as Il tenente  
 Pina Piovani as La madre del tenente 
 Ughetto Bertucci 
 Cesare Ludovici
 Guido Salvini

References

Bibliography 
 Moliterno, Gino. Historical Dictionary of Italian Cinema. Scarecrow Press, 2008.

External links 

Last Love at Variety Distribution

1947 films
Italian drama films
1947 drama films
1940s Italian-language films
Films directed by Luigi Chiarini
Films set in Italy
Italian World War II films
Italian black-and-white films
Films scored by Alessandro Cicognini
1940s Italian films